Sam Rubin (born 1960) is an American journalist who serves as the entertainment reporter for the KTLA Morning News and as a correspondent for Reelz production Hollywood Dailies. He hosts Live From the Academy Awards and the celebrity talk-show Hollywood Uncensored with Sam Rubin. Rubin has reported on the entertainment industry for over twenty years and has interviewed many Hollywood stars, including Tom Hanks, Mel Gibson, Jeff Bridges, Halle Berry, Samuel L. Jackson and Larry King. He is also the co-author of two biographies, one on the former first lady Jacqueline Onassis and another on actress Mia Farrow.

Rubin has received a Golden Mike Award for best entertainment reporter and an Associated Press Television and Radio award as part of KTLA news team's morning show. He currently lives in Los Angeles with his wife and four children. Rubin graduated from Occidental College with a Bachelor of Arts in American Studies and Rhetoric in 1982.

Rubin is also the regular Hollywood Entertainment reporter in the UK on ITV's This Morning.

Controversy
During a live on-air interview with actor Samuel L. Jackson on February 10, 2014, Rubin mistakenly asked Jackson about the success of the Super Bowl trailer advertised at the Super Bowl, which featured African American actor and former Jackson co-star Laurence Fishburne, who had reprised his role as Morpheus from The Matrix franchise for a car commercial.  Jackson was offended by this mistaken reference and proceeded to 'roast' Rubin. In his apology, Rubin claimed he was referring to another commercial, also screened at the Super Bowl, for Captain America: The Winter Soldier, which did feature Jackson, and Rubin said he had not raised this during the interview itself because he felt "stupid".  At the same time as saying that Jackson had misinterpreted him, Rubin nevertheless chastised himself for what he called "a very amateur mistake".

References

External links

American television journalists
Living people
1960 births
People from Los Angeles
American male journalists
Journalists from California